Crap la Pala (2,151 m) is a subpeak in the Lenzerheide region in the Swiss Alps. It lies in the southern face of Piz Scalottas, reaching a prominence of no more than 50 metres.

External links
Map of Switzerland showing Crap la Pala

Mountains of Switzerland
Mountains of Graubünden
Mountains of the Alps
Two-thousanders of Switzerland
Vaz/Obervaz